Alexander Friedrich Wilhelm Franz von Kotzebue (tr.  ; 9 June 1815 – 24 August 1889) was a German Romantic painter of historical scenes and battle scenes.

Life
Alexander von Kotzebue was the son of the playwright August von Kotzebue. He was born in Königsberg. On August's death in 1819, Alexander was educated in the Cadet Corps in St Petersburg, leaving it in 1834 as a Gardeleutnant. However, four years later, in 1838, he moved to an artistic career and began his artistic training at the St Petersburg Academy under Alexander Sauerweid. He spent six years at the St Petersburg Academy and at the end of them, in 1844, exhibited his first painting, The Storming of Warsaw, in St Petersburg.

He then went to continue his studies in Paris in 1846 and to Belgium, the Netherlands, Italy and Germany in 1848, before finally settling in Munich. There he became imperial professor of Russian and an honorary member of the Academy of Fine Arts Munich.

He painted several large-scale works for the Russian tsar of Russian battles in the Seven Years' War and the campaigns of Alexander Suvorov. The most important of these are considered to be the Storming of Schlüsselburg, Battle of Poltawa, Storming of Narva, Crossing of the Devil's Bridge and Founding of St Petersburg (Maximilianeum, Munich). Kotzebue died in Munich and is buried there in the Alter Südfriedhof.

Selected paintings

Sources
Sylva van der Heyden: "Kotzebue, (August) Alexander Evstafievich" by Alexander Ferdinand Wilhelm Franz In: France Nerlich and Bénédicte Savoy (Eds.), Pariser Lehrjahre. Ein Lexikon zur Ausbildung deutscher Maler in der französischen Hauptstadt. Vol.2: 1844–1870. De Gruyter, Berlin/Boston 2015 
Rostislav von Kotzebue, Geschichte und Genealogie der Familie Kotzebue, Harvas 1984

External links 

  Gallery of Kotzebue's work
  Baltic knightly family trees

1815 births
1889 deaths
Baltic-German people
German romantic painters
Artists from Königsberg
19th-century painters of historical subjects